The George Munger Award is presented to the NCAA Division I college football coach of the year by the Maxwell Football Club. The award was named after former University of Pennsylvania head coach George Munger. People who voted for the winners of the award included NCAA head coaches, members of the Maxwell Club, and sportswriters from all over the country.

In March 2010, the Maxwell Football Club announced that the award would be replaced by the Joseph V. Paterno Award. Following the breaking of the Penn State sex abuse scandal in November 2011, the club announced that the Paterno award would be discontinued. The Maxwell Club later returned Munger's name to the award.

In 2018, Army Coach Jeff Monken became the first coach from a non-major conference team to win the award since 2009 (TCU).

Winners

✝ The 1990, 1994, and 2005 awards had been given to Joe Paterno of Penn State, but the Maxwell Sports Club has rescinded the awards for those years and removed his name in the aftermath of the Penn State child sex abuse scandal and Paterno's firing.

References

External links
 

College football coach of the year awards in the United States
Awards established in 1989
Awards disestablished in 2010